The following is a list of the MTV Europe Music Award winners and nominees for Best European Act.

2000s

2010s

New Sounds of Europe
Europe's Favourite Act
Best Eastern European Act
Best Northern European Act
Best Central European Act
Best Southern European Act

See also 
 MTV VMA International Viewer's Choice Award for MTV Europe
 European Border Breakers Award

MTV Europe Music Awards
European music awards
Awards established in 2008